Ghani or The Cycle is a 2006 Bangladeshi film directed by Kazi Morshed. A Ghani is a large bullock driven oil mill. The film won National Film Awards in 11 categories.

Plot
Afsu and Shamsu are two brothers living under the rule of a local landlord. Afsu leaves the business of bullock driven oil mill for his old age complications but Shamsu continues it due to poverty. Shamsu along with his son Bozlu engaged in their forefathers' traditional business in full swing.

In the meantime, Bozlu married Moyna. Their lives start revolving around the Ghaani (oil mill). One night, the bullock was stolen from their house by some thieves. They now use  Moyna to spin the treadle.

Cast
 Masum Aziz as Afsu
 Raisul Islam Asad as Shamsu
 Arman Parvez Murad as Bozlu
 Naznin Hasan Chumki as Moyna
 Dolly Johur as Rokeya

Soundtrack
The music of this film was directed by Sheikh Sadi Khan.

Awards

References

External links
 Ghani at the Bangla Movie Database

2006 films
Bengali-language Bangladeshi films
Bangladeshi romantic drama films
Films scored by Sheikh Sadi Khan
2000s Bengali-language films
2006 romantic drama films
Best Film National Film Award (Bangladesh) winners
Films whose writer won the Best Screenplay National Film Award (Bangladesh)
Impress Telefilm films